Mary McArdle is an Irish republican and former Provisional Irish Republican Army (IRA) member.

McArdle was the Ministerial Special Adviser to Sinn Féin Culture Minister Carál Ní Chuilín and previously an IRA member, convicted of murder in 1984.  Her appointment to the position was controversial because of her conviction for the murder of Mary Travers.

Murder of Mary Travers

Two male members of the IRA approached Resident Magistrate Tom Travers, his wife, and daughter, Mary, as they left Mass. Travers was shot six times and his daughter shot once through the back. One gunman brought his gun to point-blank range at Mrs. Travers' face and fired twice, but the gun jammed. According to the Belfast Telegraph:

McArdle, then aged 19, was arrested shortly after the attack and charged "after two hand guns, a grey wig and a black sock concealed in bandages were found strapped to her thighs." Two months later 33-year-old IRA member Joseph Patrick Haughey, was arrested and charged in connection with the attack. At the trial two years later, McArdle was found guilty and received "a life sentence for her role in the murder of Mary Travers and an 18-year concurrent sentence for the attempted murder of Mr Travers." Haughey was acquitted due to lack of forensic evidence and doubts over his identity, though Tom Travers positively identified him in a line-up.

McArdle served 14 years in prison before being released early under the terms of the Belfast Agreement.

Special Adviser appointment

Following outrage at her appointment in 2011, McArdle expressed remorse for the murder of Travers, calling it "a tragic mistake".

McArdle's statement was rebutted by Mary Travers' sister, Ann, who stated:

Aftermath

In March 2012, Sinn Féin stated that McArdle had been moved from the post of special adviser to the Culture Minister to another post in the Party. She was replaced by Jarlath Kearney, a former journalist, who had previously worked as a Sinn Féin policy adviser. A Sinn Féin spokesperson said it was part of normal party policy to rotate staff.

References

Sources
 http://sluggerotoole.com/2011/06/02/while-it-may-be-described-as-being-a-mistake-she-was-shot-in-the-back/
 http://sluggerotoole.com/2011/06/23/what-are-sinn-fein-waiting-for-more-people-to-die/
 http://sluggerotoole.com/2011/06/23/just-following-orders-sf-ministers-subordinate-within-their-own-command-structure/
 https://www.bbc.co.uk/news/uk-northern-ireland-13627500
 https://web.archive.org/web/20120322091922/http://saoirse32.blogsome.com/2011/06/03/p17164/

1980s murders in Northern Ireland

Living people

Irish female murderers
Irish republicans[

Provisional Irish Republican Army members

Sinn Féin politicians
Year of birth missing (living people)